Flamejob is the sixth studio album (and 11th album overall) by the American rock band The Cramps. It was released on October 11, 1994 by Creation Records. It was recorded and mixed at the engineer Earle Mankey's Psychedelic Shack in Thousand Oaks, California. It was self-produced by Poison Ivy and Lux Interior (the latter also provided the cover photography). A UK-only reissue in 2003 contained two versions of "Ultra Twist!"

Track listing

Personnel
The Cramps
Lux Interior - vocals
Poison Ivy Rorschach - guitars, theremin
Slim Chance - bass guitar
Harry Drumdini - drums
Technical
Earle Mankey - engineer
Pat Dillon - design
Lux Interior - front cover photography

Notes and references

1994 albums
The Cramps albums
Creation Records albums